Pachypsylla celtidismamma, known generally as the hackberry nipplegall maker or hackberry psylla, is a species of plant-parasitic hemipteran in the family Aphalaridae.

References

Further reading

External links

 

Aphalaridae
Insects described in 1883